Vandenberg Space Force Base Launch Facility 06 (LC-06) is a former US Air Force Intercontinental ballistic missile launch facility on Vandenberg SFB, California, USA.  It was a launch site for the land-based LGM-30 Minuteman missile series.

References

Vandenberg Space Force Base